Stuarts Creek is a remote locality in the Australian state of South Australia  in the states's Far North region. The name and boundaries were formalised on 26 April 2013, named after Stuart Creek Station, in respect of the long established local name.

It includes the former settlement of Coward Springs. The Wabma Kadarbu Mound Springs Conservation Park lies in the north-west of the locality.

The Central Australia Railway (often referred to as the "Old Ghan") ran through Stuarts Creek, with former stations or sidings at Coward Springs, Margaret, and Stuart Creek (later Curdimurka) all within its current boundaries. The railway remnants at Coward Springs and Curdimurka are both listed on the South Australian Heritage Register.

The 2016 Australian census which was conducted in August 2016 reports that Stuarts Creek had no people living within its boundaries.

Stuarts Creek is located within the federal division of Grey, the state electoral districts of Giles and  Stuart and the Pastoral Unincorporated Area of South Australia.

Heritage listings

Stuarts Creek has a number of heritage-listed sites, including:

 Coward Springs Railway Site
 Mount Hamilton Station Site
 Curdimurka Railway Siding Complex
 Tertiary Silcrete Fossil Flora, Stuarts Creek

See also
Marree, South Australia#Climate, nearest weather station

References

Towns in South Australia
Far North (South Australia)
Places in the unincorporated areas of South Australia